SS Ohio was a wooden hulled Great Lakes freighter that served on the Great Lakes of North America from her construction in 1875, to her sinking in September 1894 when she collided with the schooner barge Ironton which also sank in the collision. Ironton was being towed by the steamer Charles J. Kershaw, which was also towing the schooner Moonlight. Ohio was found upright in 2017, over 122 years after her sinking in over 200 feet of water off Presque Isle, Michigan. In March, 2023, it was announced that Ironton had been located in 2019. The researchers who discovered Ohio plan to nominate her for a listing in the National Register of Historic Places.

History

Ohio (Official number 19438) was an early wooden bulk carrier. She was built in 1875 by Ohio resident John F. Squires of Huron, Ohio. She was launched in April of 1875. She had a gross tonnage of 1101.81 tons and a net tonnage of 850.82 tons. She was powered by a low pressure condensing engine which was fueled by a single coal-burning Scotch marine boiler. She was used to haul bulk cargoes across the lakes such as iron ore, coal and grain.

Final voyage and sinking
In September 1894 Ohio departed Duluth, Minnesota with a cargo of grain bound for Ogdensburg, New York. This journey took Ohio across Lake Superior, through the Soo Locks into Lake Huron, and past Presque Isle and Thunder Bay, Michigan. While on the Lake Huron leg of her journey Ohio encountered heavy weather.

The steamer Charles J. Kershaw was towing two schooner barges, Moonlight and Ironton. At the moment when the ships were about to pass each other, the hawser connecting Ironton and Moonlight snapped causing Ironton to veer off course and smash into the side of Ohio. Both Ohio and Ironton sank in about half an hour. All sixteen crew members from Ohio got into lifeboats and were picked up by Moonlight. Ohio First Mate was found clinging to a ladder and was later picked up by the Kershaw. The passing steamer Charles Hebard picked up two of Ironton crew but five of the schooner's crew perished including Captain Peter Girard.

Discovery
On May 23, 2017, researchers from the Thunder Bay National Marine Sanctuary discovered two shipwrecks deep within the waters of Lake Huron, off the coast of Presque Isle, Michigan. The researchers carried out several investigations between June and August; these investigations confirmed the identities of the steel-hulled steamer Choctaw and Ohio. Choctaw was lost on July 11, 1915 when she collided with the package freighter Wahcondah.

Since the Thunder Bay National Marine Sanctuary did not announce the discovery of Choctaw and Ohio until September 1, 2017, avocational shipwreck hunters continued to search for Choctaw through the summer. While searching for Choctaw, independent researchers Dan Fountain and Kurt Fosburg found Ohio on July 15, 2017, using a modified fishfinder. On July 30 Fountain returned to the site with veteran shipwreck hunters Ken Merryman and Jerry Eliason to image the wreck with Eliason’s homemade hi-definition drop video system, positively identifying the wreck as Ohio.

Ohio today
The wreck of Ohio lies completely preserved in nearly 300 feet of cold fresh water. She sits upright with a list to starboard with her foremast still standing. Her wooden pilothouse with its double helm wheel is completely intact. Near the stern, the mizzen mast is still standing with its topmast broken off. The researchers who discovered her plan to nominate her for a listing in the National Register of Historic Places.

References

Further reading
 
 Lloyd's Register of British and Foreign Shipping (1902) Lloyd's Register of British and Foreign Shipping
 

1875 ships
Great Lakes freighters
Shipwrecks of Lake Huron
Maritime incidents in 1894
Ships built in Ohio
Ships sunk in collisions
Shipwrecks of the Michigan coast
Shipwreck discoveries by Jerry Eliason, Ken Merryman and Kraig Smith
Thunder Bay National Marine Sanctuary
Wreck diving sites in the United States